Greasy Creek is a stream in Ste. Genevieve County in the U.S. state of Missouri. It is a tributary of Saline Creek.

Greasy Creek was so named on account of its greasy (or muddy) water.

See also
List of rivers of Missouri

References

Rivers of Ste. Genevieve County, Missouri
Rivers of Missouri